Purusottampur (also spelt as Purushottampur) is a town and a Notified Area Council in Ganjam district in the Indian state of Odisha.

Geography

Demographics
According to the 2001 India census, Purusottampur had a population of 14,249. Males constitute 51% of the population and females 49%. Purusottampur has an average literacy rate of 61%, higher than the national average of 59.5%: male literacy is 71%, and female literacy is 50%. In Purusottampur, 13% of the population is under 6 years of age.

Climate and regional setting
Maximum summer temperature is 37 °C; minimum winter temperature is 17 °C. The mean daily temperature varies from 33 °C to 38 °C. May is the hottest month; December is the coldest. The average annual rainfall is 1250 mm and the region receives monsoon and torrential rainfall from July to October.

Educational Institutions
 Tara Tarini College
 Narasingh Das (N.D.) High School
 Govt. Girl's High School
 Kumari Upper Primary School
 Kapileswar Sasan School
 Sunshine International School
 Little Angles International School

Attractions and Sites
 Tara Tarini Temple - One among four ancient Adi Shakti Peethas on Kumari hills at the bank of River Rushikulya. Many devotees visit the temple on the Tuesdays of hindu month Chaitra. 
 Jaugada (Samapa) - Ancient capital of Kalinga having ruins of fort and a site for tourist attraction for Edicts of Ashoka.
 Sri Kaleswar Temple of Badakharida
 Dakhineswar Kali of Pratapur
 Biju Patnaik Children's Park

Politics
Purushottampur block and N.A.C. are part of Khalikote Assembly constituency and Kabisuryanagar Assembly constituency. It is a part of Aska (Lok Sabha constituency).

References

Cities and towns in Ganjam district